The Conversio Bagoariorum et Carantanorum ("The Conversion of the Bavarians and the Carantanians") is a Latin history written in Salzburg in the 870s. It describes the life and career of Salzburg's founding saint Rupert (d. 710), notably his missionary work in Bavaria, and the activities of the bishops and abbots in the Archdiocese of Salzburg. It concludes with a brief history of Carantania.

The work may have been written by Adalwin himself, the then resident Archbishop of Salzburg. It was intended to give Louis the German a particular historical perspective on a recent collision between the missionary work conducted from Salzburg and that pursued by the brothers Cyril and Methodius, who preached the new religion among the Slavic people of Great Moravia and Pannonia. The 3 manuscripts refer to a church consecrated for Pribina in his domain called Nitrava.

Editions

Further reading

 
 Hungarian.

Medieval Latin historical texts
Duchy of Bavaria
Carantania
9th century in East Francia
9th-century Latin books